Calathea elegans is a plant species belonging to the family Marantaceae found in Colombia and Panama.

References

External links
 Goeppertia elegans at Kew Gardens (retrieved 21 July 2016)

elegans
Plants described in 1978